The Waitahu River is a river of the West Coast Region of New Zealand's South Island. It flows generally northwest from its source in the Victoria Range to reach the Inangahua River five kilometres north of Reefton.

See also
List of rivers of New Zealand

References

Rivers of the West Coast, New Zealand
Rivers of New Zealand